Albert Ingalls may refer to:
 Albert Graham Ingalls (1888–1958), American scientific editor  and amateur astronomer
 Albert Quinn Ingalls, a fictional character from the television series Little House on the Prairie